A cephalophore (from the Greek for "head-carrier") is a saint who is generally depicted carrying their own severed head. In Christian art, this was usually meant to signify that the subject in question had been martyred by beheading. Depicting the requisite halo in this circumstance offers a unique challenge for the artist: some put the halo where the head used to be, others have the saint carrying the halo along with the head, and some split the difference.
Associated legends often tell of the saint standing and carrying their own head after the beheading.

Possible origins 
The topos can be traced to two sources. In a homily on Saints Juventinus and Maximinus, John Chrysostom asserted that the severed head of a martyr was more terrifying to the devil than when it was able to speak. "He then compared soldiers showing their wounds received in battle to martyrs holding their severed head in their hands and presenting it to Christ". The other source was the Western vita of Saint Denis, founder of the see of Paris, who was identified in the text with Dionysius the Areopagite.
John the Baptist, the best known beheaded saint, is not considered a cephalophore, since he did not hold his own head in his hands.

Thus, an original, and perhaps the most famous cephalophore is Denis, patron saint of Paris, who, according to the Golden Legend, miraculously preached with his head in his hands while journeying the seven miles from Montmartre to his burying place. Although St Denis is the best known of the saintly head-carriers, there were many others; the folklorist Émile Nourry counted no less than 134 examples of cephalophory in French hagiographic literature alone. Given the frequency with which relics were stolen in medieval Europe, stories like this, in which a saint clearly indicates their chosen burial site, may have developed as a way of discouraging such acts of furta sacra.

Examples of cephalophoric saints
A cephalophoric legend of Nicasius of Rheims tells that at the moment of his execution, Nicasius was reading Psalm 119 (Psalm 118 in the Vulgate).  When he reached the verse  ("My soul is attached unto dust") (verse 25), he was decapitated.  After his head had fallen to the ground, Nicasius continued the psalm, adding,  ("Revive me, Lord, with your words"). The theme of the speaking head is extended in the 8th-century Passio of Saint Justus of Beauvais: after the child had been beheaded by Roman soldiers, his father and brother found the corpse sitting with his head in his lap. Giving the head to his father, Justus asked him to carry it to Auxerre, that his mother, Felicia,  might kiss it.

The legend of Aphrodisius of Alexandria was transferred to Béziers, where his name was inserted at the head of the list of bishops. In the hagiographic accounts, Aphrodisius was accompanied by his camel. As he was preaching, a group of pagans pressed through the crowd and beheaded him on the spot. Aphrodisius picked up his head and carried it to the chapel which he had recently consecrated at the site. It is identified today as Place Saint-Aphrodise, Béziers.
Saint Gemolo is said to have survived his decapitation and, after collecting his head, climbed on horseback. He rode to meet his uncle, a bishop, on a small mountain before he finally died.

A legend associated with Saint Ginés de la Jara states that after he was decapitated in southern France, he picked up his head and threw it into the Rhône. The head was carried by the sea to the coast of Cartagena in Spain, where it was venerated as a relic (Cartagena was the center of this saint's cult).

In The Golden Legend, Paul the Apostle at his martyrdom "stretched forth his neck, and so was beheaded. And as soon as the head was from the body, it said: Jesus Christus! which had been to Jesus or Christus, or both, fifty times." When the head was recovered and was to be rejoined to the body as a relic, in response to a prayer for confirmation that this was indeed the right head, the body of Paul turned to rejoin the head that had been set at its feet.

In legend, the female saint Osyth stood up after her execution, picking up her head like Saint Denis in Paris and other cephalophoric martyrs, and walking with it in her hands, to the door of a local convent, before collapsing there. Similarly, Valerie of Limoges carried her severed head away to her confessor, Saint Martial.

Saint Cuthbert of Lindisfarne is often depicted with his head on his neck/shoulders and carrying a second head in his hands. However, he is not a cephalophore. The second head is that of Saint Oswald of Northumbria, who was buried with him at Durham Cathedral.

In literature 
In Dante's Divine Comedy (Canto 28) the poet meets the spectre of the troubadour Bertrand de Born in the eighth circle of the Inferno, carrying his severed head in his hand, slung by its hair, like a lantern; upon seeing Dante and Virgil, the head begins to speak.

The speaking severed head appears memorably in Sir Gawain and the Green Knight.

The motif Head in Stith Thompson's Motif-Index of Folk Literature reveals how universal is the anomaly of the talking severed head. Aristotle is at pains to discredit the stories of talking heads and to establish the physical impossibility, with the windpipe severed from the lung. "Moreover," he adds, "among the barbarians, where heads are chopped off with great rapidity, nothing of the kind has ever occurred." Aristotle was doubtless familiar with the story of the singing disembodied head of Orpheus and Homer's image of heads severed so rapidly they seemed still to be speaking, and Latin examples could be attested. A link between Latin poets and the Middle Ages in transmitting the trope of the speaking head was noted by Beatrice White, in the Latin poem on the Trojan War, De Bello Troiano by Joseph of Exeter. Hector whirls in the air the severed head of Patroclus, which whispers , "Where is Achilles [Aeacides], my avenger?"

Some modern authors link the legends of cephalophores miraculously walking with their heads in their hands to the Celtic cult of heads.

Gallery

List of cephalophores

See also 
 Saint symbology
 Chhinnamasta – a Hindu goddess holding her own severed head

References

Bibliography
 
 

Types of saints
 
Christian iconography